Luminita Zaituc-Zelaskowski (originally Luminița Zaițuc; born October 9, 1968, in Bucharest) is a retired German long-distance runner of Romanian descent. She has lived in Germany since 1990, and, since 1996, she has been a German citizen.

Career
Zaituc represented her new country in the women's marathon at the 2004 Summer Olympics in Athens, Greece, where she finished in 18th position (2:36:45). Two years earlier, she won the silver medal in the same event at the 2002 European Championships in Athletics. At the national stage, she represented the sports club LG Braunschweig.

She won the Berlin Half Marathon in 2005.

In 2009, Luminita Zaituc put a stop to her athletics career, after having finished in tenth place in the Frankfurt Marathon.

Achievements
All results regarding marathon, unless stated otherwise

References

External links 

 
  Profile Luminita Zaituc
  Profile Luminita Zaituc

1968 births
Living people
Sportspeople from Bucharest
Romanian female long-distance runners
Romanian female marathon runners
German female long-distance runners
German female marathon runners
German national athletics champions
LG Braunschweig athletes
Olympic athletes of Germany
German people of Romanian descent
Athletes (track and field) at the 2004 Summer Olympics
European Athletics Championships medalists
Frankfurt Marathon female winners